Anywhen may refer to:

 At any point in time
 Anywhen, a novella by James Blish
 Anywhen, a project by Philippe Parreno

See also
 Anywhere (disambiguation)